Azad Maidan (formerly known as Bombay Gymkhana Maidan) is a triangular-shaped maidan (sports ground) in the city of Mumbai, India. It is a regular venue for inter-school cricket matches. The name Azad means "liberty" in Persian. The ground is known for its cricket pitches, for protest meetings, and for political rallies. The Bombay Gymkhana clubhouse was built in 1875, at the southern end of the maidan.

History
The vast expanses of land of the Oval Maidan, Azad Maidan, Cooperage Ground and Cross Maidan until the early 20th century formed the area known as Esplanade.

Mahatma Gandhi addressed the largest ever political meeting at Azad Maidan in December 1931.

Part of the site will be closed in 2015 to allow for construction of a station on Line 3 of the Mumbai Metro.

Cricket

The ground hosts twenty-two cricket pitches. The cricket pitches at the ground have produced many international cricketers. On 20 November 2013, Prithvi Shaw created history with 546 runs and in 1987 Sachin Tendulkar and Vinod Kambli shared a huge 664 run record partnership during a Harris Shield school match at Azad Maidan. In 2009, Sarfaraz Khan scored 439 runs in a Harris Shield match at Azad Maidan. Azad Maidan plays host to a number of cricket matches throughout the year, including Inter-School and Club matches.

See also
Azad Maidan riots
 Cross Maidan
Oval Maidan

References

Maidans in India
Year of establishment missing